Lirularia is a genus of small sea snails, marine gastropod mollusks in the subfamily Umboniinae of the family Trochidae, the top snails.

Species
Species within the genus Lirularia include:
 Lirularia acuticostata (Carpenter, 1864)
 Lirularia antoniae Rubio & Rolán, 1997
 † Lirularia aresta (Berry, 1941) 
 Lirularia bicostata (J. H. McLean, 1964)
 Lirularia canaliculata (E.A. Smith, 1871)
 Lirularia dereimsi (Dollfus, 1911)
 Lirularia discors J. H. McLean, 1984
 Lirularia iridescens (Schrenck, 1863)
 Lirularia lirulata (Carpenter, 1864)
 Lirularia monodi (Fischer-Piette & Nicklès, 1946)
 Lirularia optabilis (Carpenter, 1864)
 Lirularia parcipicta (Carpenter, 1864)
 Lirularia pygmaea (Yokoyama, 1922) 
 Lirularia redimita (Gould, 1861)
 Lirularia succincta (Carpenter, 1864)
 Lirularia yamadana (E. A. Smith, 1875)
Species brought into synonymy
 Lirularia minima (Golikov, in Golikov & Scarlato, 1967): synonym of Conotalopia minima (Golikov, 1967)

References

 Rubio F. & Rolán E. 1997. Una nueva especie de Lirularia (Gastropoda: Trochidae) de las islas de São Tomé y Príncipe. Iberus 15 (1): 23-29
 Higo, S., Callomon, P. & Goto, Y. (1999) Catalogue and Bibliography of the Marine Shell-Bearing Mollusca of Japan. Elle Scientific Publications, Yao, Japan, 749 pp

External links
 Williams S.T., Karube S. & Ozawa T. (2008) Molecular systematics of Vetigastropoda: Trochidae, Turbinidae and Trochoidea redefined. Zoologica Scripta 37: 483–506

 
Gastropod genera